Mary Lu Zahalan is a Canadian rock singer and actress.

Born in Renfrew, Ontario and raised in Oakville, Ontario, Zahalan was a Miss Canada finalist in 1976 before embarking on a career as an entertainer. She is a performing arts teacher at Oakville's Sheridan College.

She received a nomination for a Juno Award in 1983 as Most Promising Female Vocalist. In 1990, she released the album Zahalan on MCA Records, and enjoyed moderate success with the single "I Can't Forget About You" on Canadian Pop Radio.

In January 2011, Zahalan graduated from Liverpool Hope University with a master's degree in a program that studied The Beatles. She was the first graduate of the program.

Discography

Singles

Studio albums 
Zahalan (1990)

Tracks 

 I Can't Forget About You
 Fallen Angel
 A Long Way From Loneliness
 Letting Go
 Soulstar
 While We're Still Young
 I'm Holding Onto My Heart
 It Must Have Been Your Heart
 Don't Come to Me

Personnel 

 Mary-Lu Zahalan – Vocals
 Michael Landau – Guitar
 Asher Horowtiz – Guitar
 Ashley Mulford – Guitar
 Matthew Gerrard – Bass
 Paul Hannah – Drums
 Dave Tyson – Keyboards
 Rhett Lawrence – Keyboards
 Tom Keane – Keyboards, backing vocals
 Gerald O'Brien – Keyboards
 John Sheard – Keyboards
 David Boruff – Saxophone
 Christopher Ward – Backing vocals
 Eddie Schwartz – Backing vocals
 Jason Scheff – Backing vocals
 Danny Peck – Backing vocals References

Living people
Alumni of Liverpool Hope University
Canadian television actresses
People from Oakville, Ontario
Musicians from Ontario
People from Renfrew County
Canadian women rock singers
Year of birth missing (living people)
20th-century Canadian women singers